Sean Berchik (born 2 January 1980), known professionally as Seany B, is an Australian singer, songwriter, MC, record producer and DJ, who is best known for featuring on TV Rock's 2006 hit "Flaunt It" which topped the ARIA Charts for 5 weeks and went on to win two ARIA Awards for Best Dance Single as well as Highest Selling Single in 2006 as well as featured on Vanessa Amorosi's Mr Mysterious, which peaked at No. 4 in 2010 and was certified platinum. He has toured America and Europe

Discography

Singles
'''As lead and featured artist

Awards
Seany B was nominated for two ARIA Music Awards at the 2006 ceremony. He won both with TV Rock.

|-
| rowspan=2|2006
| rowspan=2| "Flaunt It" TV Rock feat. Seany B
| Best Dance Release
| 
|-
| Highest Selling Single 
| 
|}

Personal information

References

ARIA Award winners
Living people
Australian DJs
People from Melbourne
1980 births